Zhang Hui (born 8 March 1988 in Harbin, Heilongjiang) is a short track speed skater who competes for China. As part of the 3000m relay team, Zhang won the gold medal. She was accidentally injured in the face by making contact with the blade of her teammate Wang Meng during the celebration.

References

External links
 , from http://www.vancouver2010.com; retrieved 2010-02-24.

1988 births
Living people
Chinese female speed skaters
Chinese female short track speed skaters
Olympic short track speed skaters of China
Olympic medalists in short track speed skating
Olympic gold medalists for China
Medalists at the 2010 Winter Olympics
Short track speed skaters at the 2010 Winter Olympics
Asian Games medalists in short track speed skating
Asian Games gold medalists for China
Short track speed skaters at the 2011 Asian Winter Games
Medalists at the 2011 Asian Winter Games
Sportspeople from Harbin
20th-century Chinese women
21st-century Chinese women